Yekaterina Valerevna Rednikova (also Ekaterina Rednikova: , born May 17, 1973) is a Russian theatre and film actress, best known for her roles in films including The Thief and The Man of No Return.

Selected filmography
 Babnik (1990)
 The Thief (1997)
 Balalayka (2002)
 Archangel (2005)
 Bolshoe zlo i melkie pakosti (2005)
 Posledniy bronepoezd (2006)
 The Man of No Return (2006)
 Sovereign (2007)
 The Gift to Stalin (2008)
 Home (2011)
 La ligne de feu (2020)

Award

Nika Award
 1998 - Best Actress: The Thief (Katya)

References

External links 
 

1973 births
Living people
Russian film actresses
Russian stage actresses
Recipients of the Nika Award
Russian Academy of Theatre Arts alumni